Gusilay (Gusiilay, Gusilaay, Kusiilaay, Kusilay) is a Jola language of the Casamance region of Senegal.

References

Languages of Senegal
Jola languages